Borussia Dortmund Youth Sector is the youth set-up of Borussia Dortmund. The club operates the system for boys from the age of nine upwards and a total of 15 youth teams. Home games are staged at the club's training ground Hohenbuschei.

Lars Ricken, a former Dortmund player and German international, has been the youth coordinator since 2008.

The youth team has educated many players who have become regulars in the Bundesliga and the Germany national football team, such as Eike Immel, Lars Ricken and the current club Director for Sport Michael Zorc. Most recent graduates include first team regulars Marco Reus, Nuri Şahin and Marcel Schmelzer. The club has notably produced World Cup champions Mario Götze and Kevin Großkreutz.

Organization
The club recruits young players and teach them football skills required to play at that club's standard. The young apprentices offered the chance to train in close proximity to the professional players.

The club launched partnerships with United States sides Cincinnati United and La Roca Futbol Club. The cooperation will include training philosophies and drills for their coaches and annual training camps with Dortmund coaching staff.

The Evonik-Fußballschule des BVB was opened in July 2011 to provide mainstream education for the youth players who do not reside in the Dortmund area.

In 2014, a new dormitory for young players from outside of Dortmund was opened. It houses the young sportsmen who are trained to become a part of the club's professional teams.

Youth teams

Under-19
The team currently competes in the Under 19 Bundesliga and the UEFA Youth League. It also participates in the DFB-Junioren-Vereinspokal und the Under 19 Westphalian Cup. Former Under 17 head coach Benjamin Hoffmann has been the head coach since September 2016.

Under-17
The team currently competes in the Under 17 Bundesliga and the Under 17 Westphalian Cup. Sebastian Geppert has been the head coach since September 2016.

Current technical staff

Honours
Under 19 championship
Winners (8): 1993–94, 1994–95, 1995–96, 1996–97, 1997–98, 2015–16, 2016–17, 2018–19
Runners-up (1): 2008–09

Under 17 championship
Winners (7): 1983–84, 1992–93, 1995–96, 1997–98, 2013–14, 2014–15, 2017–18
Runners-up (7): 1998–99, 2000–01, 2005–06, 2006–07, 2007–08, 2015–16, 2018–19

Under 19 Bundesliga West
Winners (3): 2008–09, 2015–16, 2016–17
Runners-up (3): 2017–18, 2018–19, 2019–20

Under 17 Bundesliga West
Winners (6): 2007–08, 2013–14, 2014–15, 2015–16, 2017–18, 2018–19
Runners-up (4): 2006–07, 2010–11, 2016–17, 2019–20

DFB Junioren Vereinspokal
Runners-up (1): 2008–09

Under 19 Westphalia Cup
Winners (5): 2006–07, 2007–08, 2009–10, 2011–12, 2014–15
Runners-up (1): 2012–13

Under 17 Westphalia Cup
Winners (3): 2006–07, 2008–09, 2013–14
Runners-up (4): 2011–12, 2012–13, 2015–16, 2017–18

International youth graduates
This is a list of former Borussia Dortmund youth graduates with at least one appearance for a youth setup who have gone on to represent their country at full international level.

Fritz Walter Medal
First awarded in 2005, the Fritz Walter Medal is a series of annual awards given by the German Football Association to German youth footballers. The following youth graduates have won the medal.

References

External links
Borussia Dortmund Jugend 

Youth Academy
Football academies in Germany
Football in North Rhine-Westphalia
UEFA Youth League teams
NextGen series